San Germano Vercellese is a comune (municipality) in the Province of Vercelli in the Italian region Piedmont, located about  northeast of Turin and about  northwest of Vercelli.

San Germano Vercellese borders the following municipalities: Casanova Elvo, Crova, Olcenengo, Salasco, Santhià, Tronzano Vercellese, and Vercelli.

References

External links
Official website

Cities and towns in Piedmont